Fighting Bill Carson is a 1945 American Western film directed by Sam Newfield and written by Louise Rousseau. The film stars Buster Crabbe, Al St. John, Kay Hughes, I. Stanford Jolley, Kermit Maynard and John Cason. The film was released on October 31, 1945, by Producers Releasing Corporation.

Plot

Cast          
Buster Crabbe as Billy Carson
Al St. John as Fuzzy Q. Jones 
Kay Hughes as Jean Darcy
I. Stanford Jolley as Clay Allison
Kermit Maynard as Cass
John Cason as Joe 
John L. Buster as Steve
Bud Osborne as Sheriff

See also
The "Billy the Kid" films starring Buster Crabbe: 
 Billy the Kid Wanted (1941)
 Billy the Kid's Round-Up (1941)
 Billy the Kid Trapped (1942)
 Billy the Kid's Smoking Guns (1942)
 Law and Order (1942) 
 Sheriff of Sage Valley (1942) 
 The Mysterious Rider (1942)
 The Kid Rides Again (1943)
 Fugitive of the Plains (1943)
 Western Cyclone (1943)
 Cattle Stampede (1943)
 The Renegade (1943)
 Blazing Frontier (1943)
 Devil Riders (1943)
 Frontier Outlaws (1944)
 Valley of Vengeance (1944)
 The Drifter (1944) 
 Fuzzy Settles Down (1944)
 Rustlers' Hideout (1944)
 Wild Horse Phantom (1944)
 Oath of Vengeance (1944)
 His Brother's Ghost (1945) 
 Thundering Gunslingers (1945)
 Shadows of Death (1945)
 Gangster's Den (1945)
 Stagecoach Outlaws (1945)
 Border Badmen (1945)
 Fighting Bill Carson (1945)
 Prairie Rustlers (1945) 
 Lightning Raiders (1945)
 Terrors on Horseback (1946)
 Gentlemen with Guns (1946)
 Ghost of Hidden Valley (1946)
 Prairie Badmen (1946)
 Overland Riders (1946)
 Outlaws of the Plains (1946)

References

External links
 

1945 films
1940s English-language films
American Western (genre) films
1945 Western (genre) films
Producers Releasing Corporation films
Films directed by Sam Newfield
American black-and-white films
1940s American films